Arctodiaptomus kamtschaticus is a species of crustacean in the family Diaptomidae. It is endemic to lakes in Kamchatka, eastern Russia, and is listed as a vulnerable species on the IUCN Red List.

References

Diaptomidae
Crustaceans described in 1953
Invertebrates of Russia
Freshwater crustaceans of Asia
Endemic fauna of Russia
Taxonomy articles created by Polbot